"Little Problems" is an episode of the BBC sit-com, Only Fools and Horses. It was the final episode of series 6, and was first screened on 12 February 1989.

Synopsis
With his wedding to Cassandra approaching, Rodney is downbeat as he believes that he will never receive his diploma in computing, having apparently failed his exam again, and also has the problem of needing to find £2,000 for the couple's new flat. However, Del Boy states that he will take care of these problems, as he announces that he is giving Rodney the £2,000 as a wedding present. He then hands over Rodney's diploma, telling him that his teacher had been delayed in marking some of the diplomas. After Rodney leaves, Del admits to Uncle Albert that Rodney had in fact completely failed his exam, and his teacher required a £150 bribe in order to give a passing grade. In addition, Del will either need to sell his stock of mobile phones or get Boycie to pay up for the faulty VCRs that Del had sold him a few months previously to raise the £2,000.

The following night, Del has no luck in selling his phones, and Boycie claims to have no money, thanks to the combination of a slump in the used-car market and medical bills for his wife Marlene's pregnancy. The situation gets darker when Mickey Pearce and Jevon enter the Nag's Head with one arm in plaster and a neck collar respectively to inform Del that local crime bosses Tony and Danny Driscoll are hunting him, and that it was in fact the Driscolls who had supplied Del's phones.

The Driscoll Brothers enter the pub, prompting Del, Mickey, Jevon and Trigger to hide in the upstairs function room. The Driscolls search the room but find nothing. Just as it looks like they are safe, Trigger accidentally activates the antenna in Del's cordless phone, causing it to extend up Del's nose, giving away their hiding place. The Driscolls demand Del pays them £2,000, but Del manages to extend time on the payment by reminding them that he had looked after their mother when they got themselves jailed for their early crimes. Having seen the Driscolls enter, an intimidated Boycie enquires whether Del had bought the VCRs off them, and Del, seeing a chance to get his payment, says he did. The "skint" Boycie suddenly produces £3,000 from his jacket pocket, giving Del the money that he needs.

At Rodney's stag night, the Driscoll Brothers show up again looking for Del, who suddenly remembers that he had promised Rodney £2,000 for his flat. He goes off to talk to the Driscoll Brothers and leaves Rodney alone with Denzil, who believes that Del will use the money to pay the Driscolls off. Rodney returns to the flat late that night, angry at Del, who is in the bathroom. Del informs Rodney that his money is on the table. Del is then shown nursing his cuts and bruises, unable to stand up straight, having taken a beating from the Driscoll Brothers rather than break his promise to his younger brother.

On the day of Rodney and Cassandra's wedding, Del is the best man and Rodney is embarrassed as the minister reveals his middle name to be Charlton (named after Charlton Athletic according to Del, as their mum was a fan). Cassandra's parents Alan and Pamela also attend, although Pam fears that Alan will get drunk at the reception.

At the reception at the Nag's Head, Rodney thanks Del for his support, and leaves with Cassandra on their honeymoon. Marlene approaches Del and the two talk about past years, and Marlene asks Del why he never got married despite always being engaged when he was younger. Del tells her that none of the women he went out with was willing to care for Rodney, and he refused to put his brother into care. As a result, he broke up with them because Rodney meant more to him. The two share a heartfelt goodbye, and Del is left alone to think about life and come to terms with Rodney's new-found happiness, while Simply Red's "Holding Back the Years" plays in the background. He takes the groom topper from the wedding cake before leaving.

A few weeks later, Del returns home to the flat from the market, followed shortly by Rodney, dressed in a three-piece suit. Rodney asks Del what is for dinner, then Del offers Rodney some advice: "You don't live here no more." Realising his mistake, Rodney exits the flat in a hurry, leaving Del laughing, as he now understands that Rodney will always be with him.

Episode cast

First appearances
Alan Parry
Pamela Parry

Episode concept 
John Sullivan's idea for the script came from a drink with David Jason and Nicholas Lyndhurst one evening, which they then made into this episode.

Music
 Sam Fox: "I Only Want To Be With You"
 Chris de Burgh: "Tender Hands"
 Steven Dante: "Love Follows"
 Level 42: "Tracie"
 Hue and Cry: "Looking For Linda"
 Melissa Etheridge: "Bring Me Some Water"
 Neneh Cherry: "Buffalo Stance"
 Marc Almond & Gene Pitney: "Something's Gotten Hold Of My Heart"
 Mica Paris & Will Downing: "Where Is the Love"
 Simply Red: "Holding Back the Years"

References

External links

1989 British television episodes
Only Fools and Horses (series 6) episodes
Television episodes about weddings